Nathan Bittle (born June 3, 2003) is an American college basketball player for the Oregon Ducks of the Pac-12 Conference.

High school career
Bittle played basketball for Crater High School in Central Point, Oregon. In his sophomore season, he averaged 21.3 points, 8.5 rebounds and 4.5 blocks per game. He had 10 blocks, an Oregon School Activities Association state tournament single-game record, against Pendleton High School in a 5A consolation game. As a junior, he averaged 25 points, 11 rebounds and 4.5 blocks per game, leading his team to the 5A state semifinals before the tournament was cancelled due to the COVID-19 pandemic. He earned 5A Player of the Year accolades from The Oregonian. Bittle transferred to Prolific Prep in Napa, California for his senior season, after his Amateur Athletic Union (AAU) coach Mark Phelps was hired as head coach of the program. He was named to the rosters for the McDonald's All-American Game, Jordan Brand Classic and Nike Hoop Summit.

Recruiting
Bittle was considered a five-star recruit by 247Sports and ESPN, and a four-star recruit by Rivals. On September 15, 2020, he committed to playing college basketball for Oregon over offers from Gonzaga, UCLA and Arizona.

Career statistics

College

|-
| style="text-align:left;"| 2021–22
| style="text-align:left;"| Oregon
| 23 || 0 || 6.9 || .500 || .200 || .529 || 1.9 || .2 || .2 || .7 || 1.7

Personal life
Bittle's father, Ryan, played college basketball at the Oregon Institute of Technology.

References

External links
Oregon Ducks bio
USA Basketball bio

2003 births
Living people
American men's basketball players
Basketball players from Oregon
Centers (basketball)
McDonald's High School All-Americans
Oregon Ducks men's basketball players
People from Central Point, Oregon